Good News is the eighth studio album by Northern Irish worship band Rend Collective, released on 19 January 2018. The album includes the singles "Rescuer (Good News)" and "Counting Every Blessing".

Background 
This is the eighth album from the group that was released on January 19, 2018, by Rend Family Records and Sparrow Records.

On the track "Marching On", Australia's Hillsong Young & Free are featured.

Critical reception 
A review from AllMusic says that the album was made "with the aim of promoting a positive and joyful message in times of trouble and negativity" and was "Rich with ebullient full-throated vocals, fiddles, banjo, and plenty of hearty strumming".

Track listing

Charts

Awards and nominations 
In 2018, Good News was nominated for a Dove Award for Worship Album of the Year.

References 

2018 albums
Rend Collective albums